In geometry, the truncated order-5 pentagonal tiling is a regular tiling of the hyperbolic plane. It has Schläfli symbol of t0,1{5,5}, constructed from one pentagons and two decagons around every vertex.

Related tilings

See also

Square tiling
Uniform tilings in hyperbolic plane
List of regular polytopes

References
 John H. Conway, Heidi Burgiel, Chaim Goodman-Strass, The Symmetries of Things 2008,  (Chapter 19, The Hyperbolic Archimedean Tessellations)

External links 

 Hyperbolic and Spherical Tiling Gallery
 KaleidoTile 3: Educational software to create spherical, planar and hyperbolic tilings
 Hyperbolic Planar Tessellations, Don Hatch

Hyperbolic tilings
Isogonal tilings
Order-5 tilings
Pentagonal tilings
Truncated tilings
Uniform tilings